Western Australian soccer clubs competed in 2014 for the Football West State Cup, known for sponsorship reasons as the Cool Ridge Cup. Clubs entered from the newly formed National Premier Leagues WA, the two divisions of the State League, as well as a limited number of teams from various divisions of the 2014 Sunday League competition.  This knockout competition was won by Bayswater City, their second title.

The competition also served as Qualifying Rounds for the 2014 FFA Cup. In addition to the A-League club Perth Glory, the two finalists qualified for the final rounds of the 2014 FFA Cup, entering at the Round of 32.

Preliminary round
A total of 39 Western Australian teams took part in this stage of the competition and 3 teams were given a Bye to the First Round. 24 clubs from the All Flags State League Division 1 and State League Division 2 and 15 clubs from various divisions of the 2014 Sunday League were admitted into the competition at this stage. Matches in this round were played on 29 March 2014.

 Byes: North Perth United (5), Swan United (3) and Fremantle United (4).

First round
A total of 32 teams took part in this stage of the competition. 11 of the 12 Clubs from the National Premier Leagues WA entered into the competition at this stage, with the exception of Perth Glory Youth who were not eligible. Matches in this round were played on 5 April 2014.

Second round
A total of 16 teams took part in this stage of the competition. Matches in this round were played on 21 April 2014.

Quarter finals
A total of 8 teams took part in this stage of the competition. Matches in this round were played on 10 May 2014.

Semi finals
A total of 4 teams took part in this stage of the competition. Matches in this round were played on 2 June 2014. The two victorious teams in this round qualified for the 2014 FFA Cup Round of 32.

Final
The 2014 Cool Ridge Cup Final was held at Stirling Lions' home ground of Macedonia Park on 19 July 2014.

References

External links

Football West State Cup
2014 in Australian soccer